Ophichthus machidai is an eel in the family Ophichthidae (worm/snake eels). It was described by John E. McCosker, S. Ide, and Hiromitsu Endo in 2012.

Etymology
The eel is named in honor of ichthyologist Yoshihiko Machida, who guided Sachiko Ide through her thesis at Kochi University, Kochi, Japan.

References

machidai
Taxa named by John E. McCosker
Taxa named by Sachiko Ide
Taxa named by Hiromitsu Endo
Fish described in 2012